The Parliament of Algeria consists of two chambers:

The Council of the Nation (Upper Chamber)
The People's National Assembly (Lower Chamber)

See also

Politics of Algeria 
List of legislatures by country

References

External links
People's National Assembly
Council of the Nation

Government of Algeria
Algeria
Algeria
Algeria